Dmitri; Church Slavic form: Dimitry or Dimitri; ancient Russian forms: D'mitriy or Dmitr ( or ) is a male given name common in Orthodox Christian culture, the Russian version of Greek Demetrios (Δημήτριος Dēmētrios ). The meaning of the name is "devoted to, dedicated to, or follower of Demeter" (Δημήτηρ, Dēmētēr), "mother-earth",  the Greek goddess of agriculture.

Short forms of the name from the 13th–14th centuries are Mit, Mitya, Mityay, Mit'ka or Miten'ka (or ); from the 20th century (originated from the Church Slavic form) are Dima, Dimka, Dimochka, Dimulya, Dimusha etc. (etc.)

St. Dimitri's Day
The feast of the martyr Saint Demetrius of Thessalonica  is celebrated on Saturday before November 8 [Old Style October 26].

The name day (именины): October 26 (November 8 on the Julian Calendar) See also: Eastern Orthodox liturgical calendar.

The Saturday before October 26/November 8 is called Demetrius Saturday and commemorates the Orthodox soldiers who fell in the Battle of Kulikovo.

Notable people with the name

Historical
Dmitry Donskoy (1350–1389), Grand Prince of Muscovy
Dmitry of Pereslavl (1250–1294), Grand Prince of Vladimir-Suzdal
Dmitry of Suzdal (1324–1383), Prince of Suzdal and Nizhny Novgorod
Dmitry of Tver (1299–1326), nicknamed "The Fearsome Eyes"
Tsarevich Demetrius (1582–1591), the youngest son of Ivan the TerribleLater impostors claimed to be this son:
False Dmitry I (Grigory Otrepyev), appeared 1605–1606
False Dmitry II, appeared 1607–1610
False Dmitry III appeared 1611–1612
Dmitry Bortniansky (1751-1825), Russian composer
Dmitri Pavlovich of Russia (1891–1941), cousin of Tsar Nicholas II, took part in the assassination of Rasputin
Dmitri Mendeleev (1834–1907), Russian chemist and inventor
Dmitry Pozharsky, liberator of Moscow during the Time of Troubles
Dmitry Furmanov (1891–1926), Soviet author and political officer
Dmitri Shostakovich (1906–1975), Soviet composer
Dmitry Ustinov (1908-1984), Soviet Defense Minister
Dmitry Yazov (1921-2020), Marshal of the Soviet Union

Modern day
Dimitri Tsiribas (born 1991), Greek American Cowboy
Dmitri Alenichev (born 1972), Russian football player
Dmitri Aliev (born 1999), Russian figure skater
Dmitry Andreikin (born 1990), Russian chess grandmaster
Dmitry Bivol (born 1990), Russian boxer
Dmitri Bulykin (born 1979), Russian football player
Dmitry Bykov (born 1967), Russian writer, journalist, and poet
Dmitry Chaplin (born 1982), Russian professional dancer
Dmitry Chernyshyov (born 1975), Russian swimmer
Dmitry Fuchs (born 1939), Russian-American mathematician
Dimitri Gogos (1931–2019), Greek-Australian journalist
Dmitri Goldenkov (born 1991), Russian ice hockey player
Dmitry Glukhovsky (born 1979), Russian-Israeli author and journalist
Dmitri Hvorostovsky (1962–2017), Russian opera singer
Dmitry Kozak (born 1958), Russian politician
Dmitry Kholodov (1967–1994), Russian journalist, killed investigating alleged Russian military corruption
Dimitri Kitsikis (born 1935), Greek geopolitician
Dmitry Koldun (born 1985), Belarusian singer
Dmitry Kroyter (born 1993), Israeli Olympic high jumper
Misha Collins (born 1974), born Dmitri Tippens Krushnic, American actor
Dmitry Lepikov (born 1972), Russian freestyle swimmer
Demetri Martin (born 1973), American comedian
Dmitry  Muratov (born 1961), Russian opposition journalist, Nobel Peace Prize winner
Dmitry Medvedev (born 1965), Prime Minister and third President of the Russian Federation
Dmitry Pavlenko (born 1991), Russian handball player
Dimitri Payet (born 1987), French footballer
Dmitry Pumpyansky (born 1953/1954), Russian billionaire businessman
Dmitry Salita ("Star of David"; born 1982), American boxer
Dmitry Stepushkin (1975–2022), Russian bobsledder
Dmitri Sychev (born 1983), born Dmitri Yevgenyevich Sychev, Russian football player
Dmitry Tursunov (born 1982), Russian tennis player
Dmitry Vybornov (born 1970), Russian light-heavyweight boxer
Dmitri Young (born 1973), American baseball player

In other languages

 (Dzmitryj, Zmicier); Taraškievica: Зьміцер, Дзьмітры (Źmicier, Dźmitry, Z'mitser, Dz'mitry)
 (Dimitar)

 (Demétrios, Dimitris)

, Dmitrij
 

 (Dmitrii, Dmitry, Dmitriy, Dmitrij)
 (Dimitrije), Дмитар (Dmitar), Митар (Mitar)

 (Dmytro)

References

Russian masculine given names
Ukrainian masculine given names
Macedonian masculine given names
Slovene masculine given names
Croatian masculine given names